Rainow is a village and civil parish in Cheshire, England, in the  valley of the River Dean and next to the B5470 road between Macclesfield and Kettleshulme. It straddles the eastern side of the Peak District border of Derbyshire and Cheshire, and is surrounded by pasture farmland. The Peak District Boundary Walk runs past the village. The village's name comes from the Old English hræfn + hōh, meaning "hill-spur frequented by ravens". It is a former coal-mining village and has a population of around 2,500.

To the east of the village is Lamaload Reservoir, the first concrete reservoir constructed in England, between 1958 and 1964. At , it is also the highest constructed dam in England.

White Nancy, a circular, white-painted stone structure constructed to celebrate the anniversary of the Battle of Waterloo, stands at the northern end of Kerridge Hill on the boundary between the parishes of Rainow and Bollington.

School
Rainow Primary School has 175 pupils, covering Reception through to Year 6.

Holy Trinity Church

Holy Trinity Church was built in 1846 at a cost of £1,800 by John Mellor of Kerridge End on land donated by Joseph Harding. The architect was Samuel Howard of Disley. In 1958, the present vicarage was built adjoining the church. There are regular services and events at the Church  which are advertised on their website: www.rainowchurches.org.

Jenkin Chapel

Jenkin Chapel was constructed of local gritstone in 1733. It has an external flight of steps leading to a gallery (a small tower with a saddleback roof was added in 1754–55). Originally dedicated to St. John the Baptist, it was consecrated in 1894 and re-dedicated to St. John the Evangelist. There are monthly services on the 3rd Sunday of the month.

Cultural events
Rainow has an annual Church Fête with tea marquee, tug of war, and a fell race across Kerridge Hill that overlooks the village. The fête is also associated with a two-week display of 'scarecrows' throughout the village. An annual 5-mile race called The Rainow Five leads from the institute, up Kerridge then back down; it attracts many local runners, as well as the occasional celebrity such as Tony Audenshaw from the ITV soap Emmerdale.

Notable residents
Notable residents of the village are Stephen Morris and Gillian Gilbert, members of the bands Joy Division, New Order and The Other Two.  Both grew up in nearby Macclesfield.  The Stone Roses guitarist John Squire also lives in the village. Previous residents include the late Brian Redhead (journalist, author and broadcaster), Bill Turnbull (BBC journalist and presenter, resident 2012–16), and former Chancellor of the Exchequer George Osborne.

See also

Listed buildings in Rainow

References

External links

 Rainow website
 Rainow School Website
 Entry in Kelly's Directory of Cheshire, 1902
 Lamaload Reservoir

Villages in Cheshire
Civil parishes in Cheshire
Towns and villages of the Peak District